The Volkswagen Polo Playa is a supermini produced and sold in South Africa. From 1996 until 2002, it was a rebadged version of the SEAT Ibiza Mk2 five-door hatchback.  A separate model, the Polo Mk3, was sold in most markets during this period - this model shared its mechanical components with the Ibiza and Playa, but in hatchback form, the body panels were all different. The Polo Playa and its sedan equivalent, the Polo Classic, were the first generation of the Polo to be sold in South Africa. The South African Polo Classic was likewise based on the SEAT Córdoba Mk1 four-door sedan. In 2002, it was replaced by the Polo Mk4, although the Polo Playa name was still used in South Africa for the Polo hatchback until 2006. There were three models, 1.4i, 1.6i and 1.8i, all of which were available with a 5-speed manual gearbox only.

The name "playa" means beach in Spanish, which alludes to the fact that it's based on the Spanish SEAT Ibiza.

See also
Volkswagen Polo for an overview of all Polo models
Volkswagen Polo Mk3 - The European market car which was concurrently sold with the Playa.

References

External links
 Volkswagen South Africa

Polo Playa
Subcompact cars
Front-wheel-drive vehicles
Hatchbacks
2000s cars
Cars introduced in 1996
Cars of South Africa